This is a list of equipment used by the Philippine Navy, the branch of the Armed Forces of the Philippines that specializes in naval warfare. The service has made use of its existing equipment to fulfill its mandate while modernization projects are underway. The Republic Act No. 7898 declares the policy of the State to modernize the military to a level where it can effectively and fully perform its constitutional mandate to uphold the sovereignty and preserve the patrimony of the republic. The law, as amended, has set conditions that should be satisfied when the defense department procures major equipment and weapon systems for the navy

For the retired naval ships of the service, see the list of decommissioned ships of the Philippine Navy.

Surface combatants

Jose Rizal class frigate

Frigates made by South Korea's Hyundai Heavy Industries based on the shipbuilder's HDF-2600 design, acquired under the Horizon 1 phase of the Revised AFP Modernization Program. The first ship BRP Jose Rizal was delivered in May 2020 while the BRP Antonio Luna arrived on March 21, 2021. The two ships of the class will become the most modern surface combatants of the Philippine Navy acquired to date. However, due to budgetary constraints set during initial stages of the acquisition project, the initial two ships of the class come "fitted for but not with" (FFBNW) several subsystems, including a Close-in Weapon System (CIWS), a Vertical Launching System (VLS), and a Towed Array Sonar System (TASS) as well as several electronic subsystems. These systems are planned to be acquired and installed at a later unspecified date.

Origin:

Conrado Yap class corvette

Korean-designed general purpose corvettes made originally for the Republic of Korea Navy, which were then transferred to several friendly countries including the Philippines. Designed for coastal defense and anti-submarine operations. Being utilized by the Philippine Navy for anti-submarine warfare (ASW) training. More units are expected to be requested for transfer, as the ROKN retires several more.

Origin:

Del Pilar class offshore patrol vessel

Formerly US Coast Guard cutters of the Hamilton-class, granted to the Philippine Navy as part of US Military Assistance Program. The first ship BRP Gregorio del Pilar was handed over by the US Coast Guard to the Philippine Navy on 13 May 2011, and commissioned on 14 December 2011. Currently the 3 ships of the class are being used to train the organization on modern warship operations in preparation for future new assets being acquired under the Revised AFP Modernization Program. The class will undergo sensor upgrades, with the US government providing SAAB AN/SPS-77 Sea Giraffe AMB 3D air/surface search radars, FLIR Systems SEAFLIR 230 electro-optical/infra-red (EO/IR) system, and BAE Systems Mark 38 Mod.2 25mm gun systems under FMS & FMF programs. A separate upgrade program funded by the Philippine Navy will see the introduction of a new Combat Management System, Electronic Support Measures (R-ESM), and Hull Mounted Sonar (HMS).

Origin:

Jacinto class offshore patrol vessel

Former  of the Royal Navy's Hong Kong Squadron until they were sold to the Philippines in 1997 upon the hand-over of Hong Kong to the Chinese government. They were first commissioned between 1983 and 1984, simply designed and are tropicalized for operations in Asia. The ships underwent several phases of upgrades undertaken by the Philippine Navy, with the first one completed in 2005 replacing the old radar and navigation systems. The second upgrade involved improvements on its marine engineering systems, and a third upgrade included the improvement of combat systems.

Origin:

Malvar class offshore patrol vessel 

The ships making up this class actually came from different classes of former US Navy ships using a common hull: Admirable-class minesweepers, PCE-842-class patrol craft escorts, and PCE(R)-842-class rescue patrol craft escorts. The ships were handed over by the US government as part of Military Assistance, either directly to the Philippines becoming the first major surface combatants of the newly formed post-war Philippine Navy, or to the South Vietnamese government. Several of those given to South Vietnam eventually were absorbed with the Philippine Navy upon their escape during the end of the Vietnam War. Most were already decommissioned or lost through the years, although only one ship is still in active service with the Offshore Combat Force. This ship are planned to be retired soon.

Origin:

Amphibious warfare vessels

Tarlac class landing platform dock

New Indonesian-made landing platform docks, current the Philippine Navy's foremost amphibious warfare platform and its first major brand new ship acquisition since the 1990s. It was acquired under the "Strategic Sealift Vessel" project and was based on the Indonesian Makassar-class landing platform dock. The ships can carry up a Philippine Marine Battalion Landing Team (MBLT) with up to 500 fully armed marines and their vehicles and equipment, and carries two small landing craft utilities (LCU) with it. It has a helicopter deck capable of accommodating 2 12-tonne helicopters, as well as a hangar for 1 helicopter. The ships are expected to be installed with additional weapons and improved sensor systems. More are being planned for acquisition with slightly modified designs, under the Philippine Navy's RAFPMP Horizon 2 modernization program.

Origin:

Bacolod City class logistics support vessel

The Bacolod City-class is the Philippine Navy's main amphibious operation platform prior to the delivery of the Tarlac-class LPD. The two ships were acquired through US Foreign Military Sales (FMS) program. A contract for two ships was announced by Trinity Marine on 3 April 1992, with an option for a third ship which was not taken up. The design was based on a modified version of the US Army's General Frank S. Besson-class LSV, but without accommodation for 150 troops using the space originally for the stern ramp, and the addition of a small helicopter deck. The ship is used in a similar fashion as a Landing Ship-Tank, able to land troops and equipment directly to the beach.

Origin:

LST-1/LST-542 class landing ship tank

Former US Navy landing ships-tank that served during World War II, and transferred to numerous countries including the Philippines. The Philippine Navy received its first ships of the class on 30 December 1946, and has received almost 30 units between 1946 and 1976. Some of those that were received came through South Vietnam as several ships were absorbed by the Philippine Navy upon their escape at the end of the Vietnam War. One of the ships, BRP Sierra Madre is technically retired from service, but was deliberately grounded at Ayungin Shoal and is treated as an active ship despite being modified as a semi-permanent structure and outpost to a few Philippine Marines stationed in the contested territory. Some of the ships were also used as helicopter platforms, stationing utility helicopters from the Philippine Air Force in several occasions, including during tensions with China in the Mischief Reef in 1995.

Origin:

Tagbanua class landing craft utility

A sole ship of its class designed and built indigenously after the Philippine Navy called for the construction of a new landing craft utility (LCU). The contract to build 1 ship was awarded to Propmech Corporation in March 2010, with the Philippine Iron Construction and Marine Works (PICMW) building the ship based on a design developed with Propmech Corporation, which also supplied the propulsion and power systems of the ship. The design was not as successful as expected, and additional units were not ordered as the Philippine Navy received used landing crafts from Australia, and looked at acquiring larger, more capable strategic sealift assets.

Origin:

Ivatan class landing craft heavy

Former Balikpapan-class landing craft heavy of the Royal Australian Navy, and were built in the 1970s. Two ships were donated by the Australian Government in 2015 as it was noted that marine transport was lacking in the Philippine Navy during HADR operations following Typhoon Yolanda. All three remaining units with the RAN were purchased by the Philippine Government in 2015 and delivered by 2016. They are currently used for transport military and civilian equipment and supplies around the country.

Origin:

Mulgae class landing craft utility

Originally from the Republic of Korea Navy (ROKN), and transferred to the Philippine Navy. Currently only one ship, the former ROKN LCU-78, has been made available to the Philippine Navy and transferred in 2015, but there are no reports of potential transfer of additional ships of the class in the future. The design was loosely based on US-designed LCU-1610 by Tacoma Boatbuilding Company, and were built by Korea Tacoma in the 1970s.

Origin:

Littoral warfare vessels

Cyclone class littoral patrol vessel

The Cyclone class are inshore patrol ships currently being used by the United States Navy for low intensity conflict environment. However, United States Naval Special Warfare Command rejected the class for being too big for commando missions, while the Navy Fleet found them too small for patrol and combat missions. The Philippine Navy's ship, formerly the USS Cyclone (PC-1), serves as the lead ship of the class, and was procured as part of US Military Assistance. Following the US Occupation of Iraq, the US Navy intended to keep the remaining ships of the class. The Philippine Navy has made it known in the past that they are interested in procuring more units if the US intends to retire some other ships of the class.

Origin:

Kagitingan class littoral patrol craft

Originally designed and built in Germany, the Kagitingan class was supposed to be built in numbers in the Philippines after the initial unit. It was reported that the ships did not reach their potential design and were underpowered and problematic, and were retired in the 1990s but was pressed again to serve due to lack of operating naval assets. Out of four, only 2 ships of the class remain and are expected to be retired from service as more new assets become available.

Origin:

Acero class patrol gunboats 

Ordered by the Philippine Navy from Israel Shipyards to eventually replace the Tomas Batilo-class fast attack crafts. Twelve were originally planned but only eight were initially funded as part of the Navy's procurement plan from 2018 to 2022. Four of the boats are to be built in Israel and will feature missile armament using the Rafael Spike NLOS short-range surface-to-surface missile, while the other four will be built in the PN's Cavite Naval Yard under a technology transfer agreement and will only be fitted for but not with the missile system. An additional 1 unit was negotiated by the Philippine Navy, although it will not have missile systems. All are fitted with remote gun systems from Rafael Advanced Defense Systems. The first two units were officially christened on 6 September 2022, and were formally commissioned on 28 November 2022.

Origin:

Alberto Navarette class coastal patrol craft

Former Point-class coastal cutters of the US Coast Guard. Philippine Navy received several units transferred by the US government and formerly used by the South Vietnamese Navy, but were sold for scrap due to poor condition. Two units were transferred to the Philippine Navy as part of US Military Assistance in 1999 and 2001. Designed with steel hull and aluminium superstructure for durability compared to earlier wooden-hulled patrol crafts.

Origin:

Jose Andrada class coastal patrol craft

Designed to US Coast Guard standards and originally built by Trinity-Equitable Shipyards in New Orleans, USA. 22 units ordered by the Philippine Navy in several batches, with later batches assembled in the Philippines by Atlantic Gulf & Pacific Shipyard using knock-down kits. Earlier batches from PC-370 to PC-378 were armed only with 12.7mm and 7.62mm machine guns, later variants came standard with Mk. 38 Mod. 0 25mm Bushmaster cannons. Upgrade works are planned but still pending funding approval.

Origin:  /

Patrol boats and support vessels

Naval air wing

Weapon systems

Acquisition programs
Some of the procurement programs to replace the WW2-era ships were delayed due to the COVID-19 pandemic.

See also
 List of equipment of the Philippine Army
 List of equipment of the Philippine Air Force
 List of equipment of the Philippine Marine Corps

Notes

References

 

Ships of the Philippine Navy
Philippines
Philippines